Wilfried Fritz (born 4 June 1940) is a German former footballer who played for FC Basel in the early 1960s. He played mainly in the position of striker, but also as midfielder.

Fritz joined Basel's first team for their 1961–62 season under manager Jiří Sobotka. Fritz played his domestic league debut for the club in the away game on 27 August 1961 as Basel played against Lausanne-Sport. He scored his first goal for his club on 10 September in the away game against Grasshopper Club. In fact he scored two goals in that game, but he could not save Basel from a 3–4 defeat.

Fritz played two seasons for Basel. Between the years 1961 and 1963 he played a total of 32 games for them scoring a total of eight goals. 22 of these games were in the Nationalliga A, four in the Swiss Cup, one in the International Football Cup and five were friendly games. He scored six goals in the domestic league and the other two were scored during the test games.

References

Sources
 Die ersten 125 Jahre. Publisher: Josef Zindel im Friedrich Reinhardt Verlag, Basel. 
 Verein "Basler Fussballarchiv" Homepage

FC Basel players
German footballers
Association football midfielders
Association football forwards
1940 births
Living people